Horton's mabuya (Panopa croizati) is a species of skink, a lizard in the family Scincidae. The species is endemic to Venezuela.

Etymology
The specific name, croizati, is in honor of Italian-born botanist Léon Croizat.

Habitat

Behavior
P. croizati is terrestrial and diurnal

Reproduction
P. croizati is viviparous.

References

Further reading
Hedges SB, Conn CE (2012). "A new skink fauna from Caribbean islands (Squamata, Mabuyidae, Mabuyinae)". Zootaxa 3288: 1–244. (Panopa croizati, new combination, p. 137).
Horton DR (1973). "A New Species of Mabuya (Lacertilia: Scincidae) from Venezuela". Journal of Herpetology 7 (2): 75–77. (Mabuya croizati, new species).

Panopa
Reptiles described in 1973
Taxa named by David Robert Horton